Gonciarz is a Polish surname. Notable people with the surname include:
Jarosław Gonciarz (born 1970), politician
Krzysztof Gonciarz (born 1985), internet creator, filmmaker

See also
 

Polish-language surnames